Agostino Cardamone (born 1 December 1965) is an Italian former pro boxer of Romani origin best known for winning the European Middleweight title.

Career
Cardamone, a southpaw, started his career in 1989 and won the Italian title against Silvio Branco in 1992. In 1993 he won the European crown, and in 1995 he challenged big-punching Julian Jackson for the vacant World Boxing Council title but was knocked out by a devastating right hand in the second round.

The next year he was upset by the unknown Russian Alexander Zaitsev (record 15-6) by knockout for the vacant European title but won a rematch on points. He won the lightly regarded World Boxing Union title in 1998 against Branco and successfully defended against him before getting knocked out by Dutch boxer Raymond Joval and retiring.

External links

1965 births
People from Montoro, Campania
Living people
Middleweight boxers
Italian Romani people
Romani sportspeople
Italian male boxers
Sportspeople from the Province of Avellino
European Boxing Union champions